Murexsul octogonus, or the octagonal murex, is a species of sea snail, a marine gastropod mollusk in the family Muricidae, the murex snails or rock snails.

Description
The length of the shell attains 35.6 mm.

Distribution
This species is known only from North Island, New Zealand.

References

 Finlay, H.J. (1927). Additions to the recent molluscan fauna of New Zealand. No. 2. Transactions of the New Zealand Institute. 57: 485-487.
 Ponder, W. F. 1968. Nomenclatural notes on some New Zealand rachiglossan gastropods with descriptions of five new species. Records of the Dominion Museum, 6(4):29-47.
 Powell A W B, William Collins Publishers Ltd, Auckland 1979 
 Glen Pownall, New Zealand Shells and Shellfish, Seven Seas Publishing Pty Ltd, Wellington, New Zealand 1979 
  Maxwell, P.A. (2009). Cenozoic Mollusca. Pp 232-254 in Gordon, D.P. (ed.) New Zealand inventory of biodiversity. Volume one. Kingdom Animalia: Radiata, Lophotrochozoa, Deuterostomia. Canterbury University Press, Christchurch.

External links
 Quoy J.R.C. & Gaimard J.P. (1832-1835). Voyage de découvertes de l'"Astrolabe" exécuté par ordre du Roi, pendant les années 1826-1829, sous le commandement de M. J. Dumont d'Urville. Zoologie
  Sowerby, G. B., II. (1841). Descriptions of some new species of Murex, principally from the collection of Hugh Cuming, Esq. Proceedings of the Zoological Society of London. 8 ("1840"): 137-147
 Smith, M. (1940). Two new marine molluscs from Japan. The Nautilus. 54(2): 43, pl. 2
 Marshall, B. A.; Burch, K. W. (2000). The New Zealand Recent species of Muricopsis Bucquoy, Dautzenberg & Dollfus, 1882 (Gastropoda: Muricidae). The Nautilus. 114: 18-29
 MNHN, Paris: syntype

Muricidae
Gastropods described in 1833